The 1986 United States House of Representatives election in Wyoming was held on November 4, 1986. Incumbent Representative Dick Cheney defeated Rick Gilmore with 69.28% of the vote.

Republican Primary

Democratic Primary

Results

References

Wyoming
1986
1986 Wyoming elections
Dick Cheney